Moshe Zvi Segal (23 February 1904 – 25 September 1985) was a prominent figure in various movements and organizations in Israel, including Etzel and Lechi. He was awarded the Yakir Yerushalaim prize in 1974. He is best known for blowing the shofar at the conclusion of the Yom Kippur service at the Western Wall, defying the law of the British Mandate, which prohibited doing so.

Biography

Moshe Zvi Segal was born on 23 February 1904 (6 Shevat 5664) in Poltava, Ukraine. His father was Abraham Mordechai Segal from Mohilov, situated above the Dnieper River in White Russia. His mother was Henna Leah Menkin, whose family moved from Mohilov to Vortinschina-Zeberzhia as farmers to escape the Tzar's decree to kidnap Jewish children from their homes, forcefully prevent them from religious observance, and recruit them in the army.

The seeds of Segal's love for Jerusalem and the Holy Land were sown at an early age, when he learned about the forefathers of the Jewish People, Abraham, Isaac and Jacob in the Torah.

In 1914, as a result of the First World War, the Mir Yeshiva relocated to Poltava. Segal studied there from the age of 10 until the age of 15. In 1919, when the yeshiva returned to Poland, Segal declined the Rosh Yeshiva's invitation to join them because of his prior obligation to assist his parents with the family's meager finances.

During his years in the yeshiva he was also an avid reader of books at Poltava's Hebrew Library. His reading significantly broadened his knowledge of Jewish philosophy in the Middle Ages and later generations.

At the age of 17, Segal was accepted as a member of the HeHalutz Jewish underground organization in Poltava.

In 1924, at the age of 20, Segal immigrated with his parents and siblings to the land of Israel (then under the  British Mandate for Palestine).

In 1929, in response to King George V's decrees limiting Jewish rights and religious observance in Palestine and Jerusalem, Segal organized a large demonstration to the Kotel on 9 Av, the day of Jewish national mourning.

During the 1929 Arab riots and the pogroms in Hebron and Safed he defended Tel Aviv as a member of the Hagana. He later co-founded the Etzel military movement. Segal was also one of the founders of Brit HaBirionim.

In 1930, Segal prayed the Yom Kippur service at the Western Wall. He borrowed a shofar from Rabbi Isaac Orenstein, then Chief Rabbi of the Western Wall, and hid it until the end of the Ne'ila service, when it is the custom to sound the shofar. When the service reached its climax, Segal boldly blew the shofar for all to hear, against the law of the British Mandate, and was promptly arrested for doing so. Upon hearing of the incident, Chief Rabbi Abraham Isaac Kook announced that he would not break his fast until the young Segal was allowed to eat. Rabbi Kook telephoned the British High Commissioner of Palestine requesting Segal's release, and at about midnight that same evening, he was freed. In the years that followed, until the founding of the State of Israel in 1948, Segal arranged that a shofar be smuggled into the Western Wall area and he trained young men to sound it at the appropriate moment every year at the end of the Yom Kippur service.

Organizations
Throughout his life, Segal was a member of a number of organizations, some of which he founded himself.

1916: Tikvat Yisrael youth organization, Poltava
1920: Tzeirei Tzion, Poltava
1920: HeHalutz Ha'Adom, Poltava
1926: Hagana
1926: Hatzohar
1927: Tenuat HaRechvim
1927: Gedud Meginei HaSafah
1930: Agudat HaShomer Bagalil
1931-1932: Brit HaBirionim
1931: Etzel
1937: Brit Hahashmonaim
1943: Lechi
1943: Aguda Le'Ma'an HaShabbat
1943: Machane Yisrael
1946: Le'Asireinu
1948: Tzeirei Chabad
1968: Herut
1972: El Har Hashem
1978: Chashmonaim Movement
1979: Tehiya
1982: Shevut Ha'Aretz
1985: Shavei Tziyon

References

1904 births
1985 deaths
Israeli rabbis
Ukrainian rabbis
Mir Yeshiva alumni